In an incident, the 2018 Chimney Canyon shootout on 12 June 2018, at a remote area of southern Arizona, near the community of Arivaca, a United States Border Patrol agent was wounded in an early morning shootout with Mexican smugglers.

Incident
The US Border Patrol agent, who has not been identified, was on foot patrol and alone, responding to a movement sensor activation at approximately 4:30 AM in Chimney Canyon, just north of the ghost town of Ruby, Arizona, along a well known smuggler's route, which leads north from the international boundary to Arivaca, about 10 miles north of the border. While investigating the activation, the agent was ambushed and fired upon from multiple sources, and was shot in one of his hands and one of his legs, and several times more in his bullet proof vest.

The agent, who is a 21-year veteran of the US Border Patrol, and also a paramedic, was able to return fire and escape his attackers, while applying first aid and retreating to his patrol vehicle, where he was able to call for assistance; eventually being evacuated via helicopter. A US Border Patrol tactical team was also called in and on the ground captured several illegal migrants in the immediate area, who are currently being investigated by the FBI for any potential involvement in the shooting.

Location
Local Arizona rancher and longtime resident, Jim Chilton, who owns a 50,000 acre spread in the immediate area, says the shootout occurred on his land, in an area known for drug smuggling and human trafficking from across the nearby Mexican border. He also said thatover 200 trails criss-cross his ranch, and that the shooting occurred on the most traveled trail. The area is mountainous and rugged, and was featured in the 2015 documentary film Cartel Land.

Reaction
Rep. Martha McSally (R-AZ) issued the following statement: "Relieved the U.S. Border Patrol Agent shot on duty this morning near Arivaca, AZ survived. Praying for full recovery & to find assailant. Thanks to the @CBPArizona team who responded so quickly. A reminder that border patrol agents & CBP officers are on the frontlines every day."

See also

 Mexican Drug War
 2010 Saric shootout

References

Battles of the Mexican drug war
2018 in Arizona
Conflicts in 2018
Organized crime events in the United States
July 2018 events in the United States
United States Border Patrol